
Krasnystaw County is a unit of territorial administration and local government (powiat) in Lublin Voivodeship, eastern Poland. It was established on January 1, 1999, as a result of the Polish local government reforms passed in 1998.

As of 2019, its total population is 63,554, out of which the population of Krasnystaw is 18,675 and the rural population is 44,879.

Neighbouring counties
Krasnystaw County is bordered by Chełm County to the north-east, Zamość County and Biłgoraj County to the south, Lublin County to the west, and Świdnik County to the north-west.

Administrative division
The county is subdivided into 10 gminas (one urban and nine rural). These are listed in the following table, in descending order of population. (Until 2006 the county also included Gmina Rejowiec, which is now in Chełm County.)

References

 
Krasnystaw